The John J. Suhr House is a historic house located on Langdon Street, Madison, Wisconsin, United States.

History
Built in 1886, the house was admitted to the National Register of Historic Places listings in Dane County, Wisconsin on June 17, 1982. The residence was built in the French Second Empire architectural style by the local prominent architect Captain John Nader, who also designed Holy Redeemer Catholic Church (1869), St. Patrick's Catholic Church (1888–89), the Suhr Bank Building (1887), and the city's first sewer system. The house features a mansard roof, stone window trim and fancy woodwork on the bays. Additional construction occurred in 1902.

The house's first owner, John J. Suhr, was born in Bremen, Germany, in 1836 and immigrated to Madison in 1857. He worked as a bookkeeper in the State Bank until 1871, when he founded the German Bank. He changed the name of the bank to the German-American Bank in 1885. John J. Suhr died in 1901. His family owned and resided in the Suhr House for two generations until the death of John J. Suhr's son, John J. Suhr, Jr., in 1957.

In 1989, it became a Alpha Xi Delta sorority house, and in 1994 it was sold to a private landlord. 

The house currently serves as off-campus student housing, like the majority of the former houses on Langdon Street.

References 

Houses in Madison, Wisconsin
Houses completed in 1902
Houses on the National Register of Historic Places in Wisconsin
Second Empire architecture in Wisconsin
National Register of Historic Places in Madison, Wisconsin
Alpha Xi Delta